Len Rix is a Zimbabwe-born translator of Hungarian literature into English, noted for his translations of Antal Szerb's Journey by Moonlight and The Pendragon Legend and of Magda Szabó's The Door and Katalin Street.

Early life and education
Len Rix was born in Zimbabwe in 1942, where he studied English, French and Latin at the (then) University College of Rhodesia and Nyasaland. In 1963 he won a Commonwealth Scholarship to King's College, Cambridge, where he read English. He worked as a lecturer at the University of Rhodesia/Zimbabwe and subsequently as a teacher of English at Manchester Grammar School (where he was also Head of Careers), before retiring in 2005 to live in Cambridge. Rix learned Hungarian on his own, using textbooks, audio recordings and literature.

Translations
Len Rix's first published translation from Hungarian was of Tamás Kabdebó's Minden idők (A Time for Everything) (Cardinal Press, 1995), but he is best known for his renderings of Antal Szerb, especially Journey by Moonlight (Utas és holdvilág, 1937), and of Magda Szabó's The Door (Az ajtó, 1987) and Katalin Street (Katalin utca, 1969).

Awards and honors
2006 Independent Foreign Fiction Prize (short-listed) for the translation of Magda Szabó's The Door 
2006 Oxford-Weidenfeld Translation Prize winner, for the translation of Magda Szabó's The Door
2015 New York Times Book Review 10 Best Books of 2015, for Magda Szabó's The Door
2018 PEN Translation Prize, winner, for the translation of Katalin Street by Magda Szabó
2019 Warwick Prize for Women in Translation (short-listed) for the translation of Magda Szabó's Katalin Street
2020 Hyman Wingate Prize for Writing about Jewry, long-listed for Magda Szabó's Katalin Street
 2020 Warwick Prize for Women in Translation (short-listed) for the translation of Magda Szabó's Abigail
 2021 Hungarian Gold Cross of Merit (Magyar Köztársasági Arany Érdemkereszt - Polgári) for his work in translating Hungarian literary classics into the English language

Bibliography

Literary works translated from Hungarian 
 A Time for Everything (Minden idők), by Tamás Kabdebó), Cardinal Press, 1995
 Journey by Moonlight (Utas és holdvilág), by Antal Szerb), Pushkin Press, 2001
 The Door (Az ajtó), by Magda Szabó), Harvill Secker, 2005
 The Pendragon Legend (A Pendragon legenda), by Antal Szerb), Pushkin Press, 2006
 Oliver VII (VII. Olivér), by Antal Szerb, Pushkin Press, 2007
 The Queen's Necklace (A királynő nyaklánca), by Antal Szerb), Pushkin Press, 2009
 Love in a Bottle (Szerelem a palackban), by Antal Szerb, Pushkin Press, 2010
 The Third Tower (A harmadik torony), by Antal Szerb, Pushkin Press, 2014
 A Martian's Guide to Budapest (Budapesti kalauz marslakók számára), by Antal Szerb, Magvető, 2015
 Katalin Street (Katalin utca), by Magda Szabó, NYRB Classics, 2017
 Abigail (Abigél), by Magda Szabó, NYRB Classics, 2020
 The Enchanted Night, Transylvanian and other Tales, by Miklós Bánffy, Pushkin Press, 2020

Other translations 
 In the Footsteps of the Gods (from the early journalism of Sándor Márai),The Hungarian Quarterly No. 185, Spring 2007

Other publications 
 "Shakespeare's Meaning in 'The Merchant of Venice'", University of Rhodesia 'Studies in Literature' Series, No 7, 1974
 "Charles Mungoshi's 'The Coming of the Dry Season'", Mambo Review of Contemporary African Literature, November 1974
 "Some Recent Criticism of Doris Lessing", Zambezia, Vol. 4, No. 2, 1977
 The Selected Works of Arthur Shearly Cripps, Mambo Press, 1976 (co-editor, responsible for Introduction and Bibliography)
 Rhodesian Literature in English: A Bibliography (with Pichanik et al.), Mambo Press, 1977
 "The Subtle Art of Antal Szerb", The Hungarian Quarterly, No. 186, Summer 2007
 "Magda Szabó: Acclaimed author of 'The Door'" (obituary), The Independent, November 2007
 "In Praise of Translation", The Hungarian Quarterly, No. 193, Spring 2009

Poetry 
 Anthologised in Rhodesian Poetry Nos 11 (1972-3), 12 (1975) and 13 (1976-7)
 Anthologised in 25 Years of South African Poetry, New Coin, Grahamstown, 1980
 Individual poems in Two Tone (Rhodesia), New Coin (South Africa), Staple, Iota,The Interpreter's House (UK), and The New Hungarian Quarterly (Hungary)

Film 
 The Door (2005), translation used for English version of 2012 film The Door by István Szabó, starring Helen Mirren
 Evolution (2021), English language translation of script by Kata Wéber and Kornél Mundruczó

References

External links
Guardian review of Journey By Moonlight
Translation of Antal Szerb's A Martian's Guide to Budapest in Hungarian Quarterly (2005)
Interview with Hungarian Literature Online
Article on Great Zimbabwe
The Independent review of The Pendragon Legend
Translation of Magda Szabó's Katalin Street
The Telegraph review of Katalin Street
Translation of Magda Szabó's Abigail
The Spectator review of Abigail
Interview with Fidelio
Times Literary Supplement review of Katalin Street and Abigail

Hungarian–English translators
Living people
Alumni of University of London Worldwide
Alumni of the University of London
University of Zimbabwe alumni
Academic staff of the University of Zimbabwe
1942 births
White Rhodesian people
Alumni of King's College, Cambridge